Shemsu Hassan (born 1968) is an Ethiopian former racewalker. He competed in the 1992 Summer Olympics.

Competition record

References

1968 births
Living people
Ethiopian male racewalkers
Olympic athletes of Ethiopia
Athletes (track and field) at the 1992 Summer Olympics
Ethiopian male athletes
World Athletics Championships athletes for Ethiopia
African Games gold medalists for Ethiopia
African Games medalists in athletics (track and field)
Athletes (track and field) at the 1987 All-Africa Games
Athletes (track and field) at the 1991 All-Africa Games
Athletes (track and field) at the 1995 All-Africa Games
Athletes (track and field) at the 1999 All-Africa Games
20th-century Ethiopian people